Shooting competitions at the 2012 Summer Olympics in London took place from 28 July to 6 August at the Royal Artillery Barracks in Woolwich. Fifteen events were included with 390 athletes taking part. The events were the same as in 2008.

The competitions were originally planned for the National Shooting Centre in Bisley, Surrey, and the temporary solution at the Royal Artillery Barracks (which is in the River Zone) was adopted later after the International Olympic Committee expressed concerns about the distance between London and Bisley.

Since the pistols used in the 25m and 50m shooting events were deemed by HM Government as prohibited in England, Scotland and Wales after the Dunblane Massacre, special dispensation had to be granted by the UK Government and security criteria met by LOCOG to allow certain events to go ahead.

Qualification

The qualification system was similar to that used for previous Games, with a fixed number of quota places divided among the nations whose shooters place well at the top-level global and continental championships. However, due to new IOC regulations mandating that all qualification events take place during the last 24 months before the Olympics, no such quota places were awarded during the 2009 ISSF World Cup or the 2010 ISSF World Cup, leading to decreased interest in these competitions to the point where the 2010 competition planned for New Delhi had to be rescheduled and moved to Australia. The International Shooting Sport Federation announced that qualification would commence with the 2010 ISSF World Shooting Championships in Munich, which ended on 10 August, almost exactly two years before the Olympics.

Great Britain did not qualify spots through the World Championship, rather its places were guaranteed due to it being the host nation, however it could qualify shooters to the other events. Iran was the only country that did not send shooters to the 2008 Summer Olympics to have qualified a shooter for the 2012 Summer Olympics.

Schedule

Medal summary

Medal table

Men's events

Women's events

References

External links 

 
 
 

 
2012
2012 Summer Olympics events
Olympics
Shooting competitions in the United Kingdom